Olimpia Boronat (1859 or 1867 – 1934) was an Italian operatic coloratura soprano, noted for her performances of the soprano roles in the bel canto repertory.

Boronat was born in Genoa, and made her debut either there or in Naples during 1885. She sang around the world, particularly the Spanish-speaking world, but was particularly associated with Russia; she first sang there at St Petersburg in 1894. She married a member of the Polish aristocracy, and retired from the stage for six years from 1896 to 1902. After her hiatus, she sang initially in Russia; it was not until 1909 that she returned to her native Italy to sing.

Boronat was noted for a voice of great beauty and clarity, and exceptional technical ability, coupled with sensitive musicianship. She was particularly associated with the roles of Rosina in The Barber of Seville, Violetta in La traviata, Elvira in I puritani, and Ophélie in Hamlet.

After her retirement, Boronat founded a singing school in Warsaw.

Recordings
Boronat's complete recordings, dating from 1904 and 1908, were released by Marston Records in 1997. These include works by Alexander Alyabyev, Bellini, Bizet, Donizetti, Flotow, Pietro Giannelli, Gounod, Mikhail Ivanov, Meyerbeer, Tosti, Verdi, and Redento Zardo.

References

 Rosenthal, Harold; & Warrack, John (1979). Concise Oxford Dictionary of Opera (Revised Edition). London: Oxford University Press, pp. 58–9

External links
Liner notes by Michael Scott (1997) to the complete recordings

Italian operatic sopranos
Musicians from Genoa
19th-century births
1934 deaths
Year of birth uncertain
Musicians from Warsaw